Tahlia May McGrath (born 10 November 1995) is an Australian cricketer. She made her Women's One Day International cricket (WODI) debut against South Africa on 27 November 2016. She made her women's Test debut in The Women's Ashes in November 2017.

Career

After missing out on Australia's squad for the 2017 Women's Cricket World Cup, McGrath was recalled to the team when she was named in Australia's squad for the Women's Ashes. She was named in both the WODI squad and the Test squad. On 26 October 2017, she took her first international wicket in the second WODI match against England.

She made her Test debut for Australia Women against England Women on 9 November 2017 in The Women's Ashes.

In November 2018, she was named in the Adelaide Strikers' squad for the 2018–19 Women's Big Bash League season. In April 2019, Cricket Australia awarded her with a contract with the National Performance Squad ahead of the 2019–20 season. In April 2020, Cricket Australia awarded McGrath with a central contract ahead of the 2020–21 season.

In August 2021, McGrath was named in Australia's squad for their series against India, which included a one-off day/night Test match as part of the tour. On 21 September 2021, in the first of the series' three WODI matches at Great Barrier Reef Arena, Mackay, Queensland, she swung the ball both ways while bowling, and really troubled some of India's best players, but did not take a wicket, and did not bat. In the second WODI on 24 September 2021, also at Mackay, she claimed 3-45, and then made a career-best 74 in 77 balls, sharing in a partnership with Beth Mooney that helped to propel Australia from the lowest point in its run chase to a cliffhanging victory. She made her Women's Twenty20 International (WT20I) debut on 7 October 2021, for Australia against India.

In January 2022, McGrath was named in Australia's squad for their series against England to contest the Women's Ashes. In the first match of the series, a WT20I fixture, McGrath became the first Australian all-rounder to take three wickets and score more than 75 runs in a WT20I, finishing with figures of 3-26 and an unbeaten 91 off 49 balls. McGrath was named the Player of the Series, after scoring 225 runs and taking 11 wickets during the Women's Ashes.

Also in January 2022, McGrath was named in Australia's team for the 2022 Women's Cricket World Cup in New Zealand. In April 2022, she was bought by the Southern Brave for the 2022 season of The Hundred in England. The following month, McGrath was named in Australia's team for the cricket tournament at the 2022 Commonwealth Games in Birmingham, England.

In August 2022 during Common Wealth Games 2022, McGrath was to play Finals against India even after testing positive for Covid-19 with mild symptoms

References

External links

Tahlia McGrath at Cricket Australia

1995 births
Living people
Australia women Test cricketers
Australia women One Day International cricketers
Australia women Twenty20 International cricketers
Adelaide Strikers (WBBL) cricketers
Cricketers from Adelaide
Lancashire Thunder cricketers
South Australian Scorpions cricketers
UP Warriorz cricketers
Cricketers at the 2022 Commonwealth Games
Commonwealth Games gold medallists for Australia
Commonwealth Games medallists in cricket
20th-century Australian women
21st-century Australian women
Southern Brave cricketers
Australian expatriate sportspeople in England
Medallists at the 2022 Commonwealth Games